Jules Verne Sikes (October 22, 1904 – May 20, 1964) was an American football, basketball, and baseball player and coach. He was a graduate of Texas A&M University where he was a three-sport star, lettering three years each in baseball, basketball and football. He played end for Dana X. Bible's Texas A&M football teams from 1925 to 1927 and was All-Southwest Conference and mentioned as All-American. He played minor league baseball with Shreveport, Louisiana of the Class A Texas League after college. Sikes was an assistant coach for ends at the University of Georgia in Wally Butts first year as head football coach in 1939 until leaving for Kansas after the 1947 season, interrupted by service in World War II. He coached the Kansas Jayhawks from 1948 to 1953, compiling a 35–25 record. He succeeded George Sauer who left Kansas for United States Naval Academy. From 1954 to 1963, he coached at East Texas State University, amassing a 63–34–4 record. The Lions won five Lone Star Conference championships during his tenure and won both the Tangerine Bowl twice, at the end of the 1957 and 1958 seasons. He was a proponent of the T formation.

Sikes died on May 20, 1964, in Commerce, Texas, after collapsing on the golf course at East Texas State.

Head coaching record

Football

References

External links

1904 births
1964 deaths
American football ends
Basketball coaches from Texas
Georgia Bulldogs baseball coaches
Georgia Bulldogs football coaches
Kansas Jayhawks football coaches
Saint Mary's Pre-Flight Air Devils football coaches
Texas A&M Aggies baseball coaches
Texas A&M Aggies football players
Texas A&M–Commerce Lions football coaches
Texas A&M–Commerce Lions men's basketball coaches
People from Leonard, Texas
People from Commerce, Texas